Feeali (Dhivehi: ފީއަލި) is one of the inhabited islands of Faafu Atoll.

Geography

Demography

See also

List of lighthouses in the Maldives

References

Islands of the Maldives
Lighthouses in the Maldives